Mario Lorenzo Falcone is an English television personality and tailor. He is known for his appearances in the reality programme The Only Way Is Essex.

Career
Falcone made his debut appearance on The Only Way Is Essex during the third series in 2011 and stayed until the sixteenth series, before returning for the nineteenth series and departing again after the twenty-first series. He was suspended for promoting slimming pills on social media.

On 22 August 2013, Falcone entered the Celebrity Big Brother house, competing in the twelfth series. He was the third TOWIE cast member to appear on the show, following Amy Childs in 2011 and Kirk Norcross in 2012. On 13 September, he finished fifth and left the house with fellow housemate and sixth place Vicky Entwistle.

Personal life
Brought up in Shenfield, Essex, Falcone is English of Italian descent. He is the brother of author Giovanna Fletcher, who is the wife of McFly's Tom Fletcher. Falcone was previously engaged to Lucy Mecklenburgh; they split in 2012.

Filmography

References

Living people
Television personalities from Essex
English television personalities
English people of Italian descent
English people of Argentine descent
Year of birth missing (living people)